Colonel Robert Bolling (December 26, 1646July 17, 1709) was an English-born merchant, planter, politician and military officer.

Early life 
Robert Bolling was the son of John Bolling (b. 1615) and Mary Carie (née Clarke) Bolling. He was named after his grandfather Robert Bolling; his grandmother was Anne Clarke. He was born at Tower Street, All Hallows, Barking Parish, in London on December 26, 1646. His father John, was one of the Bollings of Bolling Hall, near Bradford, England. Robert's ancestry could be traced to Robert Bolling, Esquire, who died in 1485 and was buried in the family vault in the church of Bradford.
On October 2, 1660, at the age of fourteen, Bolling arrived in the colony of Virginia.

In 1674, he married Jane Rolfe, daughter of Thomas Rolfe, the son of Pocahontas. They had one son, John Bolling (January 26, 1676 – April 20, 1729). Jane Rolfe Bolling is believed to have died shortly after their sons birth. John Bolling married Mary Kennon, daughter of Richard Kennon and Elizabeth Worsham, and they had seven children.

Second marriage 
In 1681, after his first wife died, Col. Bolling married his second wife Anne Stith, daughter of John Drury and Jane (Gregory) Stith. They had the following children together:
Robert Bolling Jr. (1682–1749), married Anne Mary Cocke. Robert was the grandfather of Beverley Randolph, the eighth Governor of Virginia. Robert and Anne were also the great-grandparents of Anne Custis – wife of Robert Edward Lee.
Stith Bolling (1686–1727), married Elizabeth Hartwell.
Captain Edward Bolling (1687–1710), married Ms. Slaughter died of smallpox at sea.
Anne Bolling (1690–1750), married Robert Wynne.
Drury Bolling (1695–1726), married Elizabeth Meriwether. (Elizabeth's brother Nicholas Meriwether was a great-great-grandfather of Captain Meriwether Lewis the explorer.)
Thomas Bolling (1697–1734).
Agnes Bolling (1700–1762), married Richard Kennon.

The descendants of Robert Bolling's first marriage are sometimes referred to in family history forums as "Red Bollings" due to the Native American lineage of Jane Rolfe's grandmother Pocahontas. These "Red Bollings" include prominent descendants such as Edith Bolling Wilson, wife of U.S. President Woodrow Wilson. Bolling's great-grandson, Robert Bolling, was one of the most prolific poets in colonial Virginia.
The descendants of his second marriage are referred to as "White Bollings".

Career and death 
As a successful merchant and planter, Bolling acquired a large estate, Kippax Plantation. He was colonel of the militia and was a member of the House of Burgesses representing Charles City County in 1702.

Robert Bolling died on July 17, 1709, and was buried on his plantation Kippax, in Prince George Co., Virginia, where his tomb still stands. However, in 1858, his remains were removed from Kippax to the Bolling mausoleum at Blandford Cemetery in Petersburg, Virginia erected by his great grandson.

Archaeological record 
Archaeologist Donald W. Linebaugh, of the University of Kentucky, located the remains of Col. Bolling's house in Hopewell, Virginia in 2002.

References

Sources 
 American Presidential Families, Hugh Brogan and Charles Mosley, Macmillan Publishing Company, New York, 1993.
 Pocahontas, alias Matoaka, and her descendants : at Jamestown, Virginia, in April, 1614, with John Rolfe, gentleman : including the names of Alfriend, Archer, Bentley, Bernard, Bland, Bolling, Branch, Cabell, Catlett, Cary, Dandridge, Dixon, Douglas, Duval, Eldridge, Ellett, Ferguson, Field, Fleming, Gay, Gordon, Griffin, Grayson, Harrison, Hubard, Lewis, Logan, Markham, Meade, McRae, Murray, Page, Poythress, Randolph, Robertson, Skipwith, Stanard, Tazewell, Walke, West, Whittle, and others : with biographical sketches, Wyndham Robertson, J. W. Randolph & English, 1887.

External links 
UK Archaeologist Locates 17th Century Merchant's House, Plans Excavation with Students, Dan Adkins, March 8, 2002
Kippax Plantation Contributions

1646 births
1709 deaths
American people of English descent
American planters
Bolling family of Virginia
People from the City of London
Rolfe family of Virginia
English emigrants
Colonial American merchants
American slave owners